The 1979 Wyoming Cowboys football team was an American football team that represented the University of Wyoming as a member of the Western Athletic Conference (WAC) during the 1979 NCAA Division I-A football season.  In their third and final season under head coach Bill Lewis, the Cowboys compiled a 4–8 record (2–5 against conference opponents), finished in seventh place out of eight teams in the WAC, were outscored by a total of 276 to 186, and played their home games at War Memorial Stadium in Laramie, Wyoming.

For the first time since 1958, Wyoming played a home game in the month of November.

Schedule

Roster

References

Wyoming
Wyoming Cowboys football seasons
Wyoming Cowboys football